Two Brothers is a 2013 action role-playing game developed and published by AckkStudios.

The game received mixed reception from video game critics.

Gameplay
Two Brothers is an action role-playing game.

Development
Two Brothers was developed by AckkStudios. Inspiration for the game came from game director Brian Allanson's childhood playing of Game Boy and the trend of demakes. To fund the game, a Kickstarter campaign was made, asking for $6,000. The campaign ended at $16,257 with 779 backers.

A director's cut of the game was planned for the PC, Mac, Linux, PlayStation 4, PlayStation Vita and Wii U's Nintendo eShop. The original game was planned for release on Wii U in 2012 with a third-party developer handling the port. The Unity engine would be used for the game. It would also be renamed to Chromophore: The Two Brothers. This was to avoid confusion with Brothers: A Tale of Two Sons. The game was delayed in 2016 as AckkStudios was wrapping development of YIIK: A Postmodern RPG, saying it was 75 percent complete. While AckkStudios said the game was still in development in 2017, as of 2022, the game has not been released.

Reception

On release, Two Brothers received mixed reception from video game critics.

References

External links

2013 video games
Action role-playing video games
Cancelled Wii U games
Fantasy video games
Indie video games
Kickstarter-funded video games
Retro-style video games
Top-down video games
Video games developed in the United States
Windows games
Windows-only games